"Joy Spring" is a jazz composition by Clifford Brown and is his signature song.

Joy Spring may also refer to:

Joy Spring (Joe Pass album), 1964
Joy Spring (Harold Mabern album), 1985
Joy Spring, 2010 album by Bill Carrothers

See also
 Spring of Joy, a 1993 Swedish film